Sweden competed at the 1988 Winter Olympics in Calgary, Alberta, Canada.

Medalists

Competitors
The following is the list of number of competitors in the Games.

Alpine skiing

Men

Men's combined

Women

Biathlon

Men

Men's 4 x 7.5 km relay

 1 A penalty loop of 150 metres had to be skied per missed target.
 2 One minute added per missed target.

Bobsleigh

Cross-country skiing

Men

 C = Classical style, F = Freestyle

Men's 4 × 10 km relay

Women

 C = Classical style, F = Freestyle

Women's 4 × 5 km relay

Figure skating

Men

Women

Ice hockey

Summary

Group A
Top three teams (shaded ones) entered the medal round.

Sweden 13-2 France
Sweden 1-1 Poland
Sweden 4-2 Switzerland
Finland 3-3 Sweden
Canada 2-2 Sweden

Medal round
The top three teams from each group play the top three teams from the other group once. Points from previous games against their own group carry over.

 Sweden 6-2 Czechoslovakia
 Soviet Union 7-1 Sweden
 Sweden 3-2 West Germany

Leading scorers

Team roster
Peter Lindmark
Peter Åslin
Peter Andersson
Anders Eldebrink
Thomas Eriksson
Lars Ivarsson
Mats Kihlström
Lars Karlsson
Tommy Samuelsson
Mikael Andersson
Jonas Bergqvist
Bo Berglund
Thom Eklund
Peter Eriksson
Michael Hjälm
Mikael Johansson
Lars Molin
Lars-Gunnar Pettersson
Thomas Rundqvist
Ulf Sandström
Håkan Södergren
Jens Öhling
Head coach: Tommy Sandlin

Luge

Men

Ski jumping 

Men's team large hill

 1 Four teams members performed two jumps each. The best three were counted.

Speed skating

Men

Women

References

External links
 Olympic Winter Games 1988, full results by sports-reference.com

Nations at the 1988 Winter Olympics
1988
Winter Olympics